Martin Semerád (born 24 May 1990) is a Czech rally driver. He currently races in the Production World Rally Championship and has done since the 2009 season. He was one of the Pirelli Star Drivers in 2009. He won PWRC at 2011 Rally Sweden and he is current youngest winner of PWRC rally.

WRC results

PWRC results

Czech Rally Championship results

External links 
 Official website

1990 births
Czech rally drivers
Living people
World Rally Championship drivers